The 13th ACTRA Awards were presented on April 3, 1984. The ceremony was hosted by Laurier LaPierre, Ann Mortifee and Jayne Eastwood.

Television

Radio

Journalism and special awards

References

1984 in Canadian television
1984 television awards
ACTRA Awards